David Stewart (died 1476) was a prelate from 15th century Scotland. A member of the Stewart kindred of Lorne, he is known to have held a succession of senior ecclesiastical positions in northern Scotland before eventually succeeding his brother James Stewart as Bishop of Moray.

David was provided to the bishopric before 30 June 1462 by Pope Pius II, and was consecrated sometime after 25 June 1463. David was a frequent attendee at parliament and was in the presence of King James III of Scotland on 5 August 1464, at Inverness. He built the great tower of Spynie Castle known as "David's Tower". He found himself in conflict with the Alexander, Earl of Huntly, who was at one point excommunicated until the differences were overcome by mediators.

Bishop David died in 1476. He was buried in the St Peter and St Paul aisle in the north of Elgin Cathedral, beside his brother. He was succeeded by William Tulloch.

References
 Dowden, John, The Bishops of Scotland, ed. J. Maitland Thomson, (Glasgow, 1912)
 Keith, Robert, An Historical Catalogue of the Scottish Bishops: Down to the Year 1688, (London, 1924)
 Watt, D.E.R., Fasti Ecclesiae Scotinanae Medii Aevi ad annum 1638, 2nd Draft, (St Andrews, 1969)

1476 deaths
Bishops of Moray
Medieval Gaels from Scotland
15th-century Scottish Roman Catholic bishops
People from Argyll and Bute
Burials at Elgin Cathedral
Year of birth unknown